The 100 Greatest TV Series of the 21st Century is a list compiled in October 2021 by the British Broadcasting Corporation (BBC), as part of their annual critics' poll, chosen by a voting poll of 206 television experts (critics, journalists, academics and industry figures) from 43 countries.

It was compiled by collating the top ten series submitted by the experts who were asked to list the best series that began airing since the year 2000. Television that began in the 20th century but continued airing in the 21st century weren't eligible for inclusion   (e.g. Doctor Who, South Park, Buffy the Vampire Slayer and The Sopranos). The third season of Twin Peaks (subtitled "The Return") is eligible due to it being commissioned as a stand-alone miniseries as opposed to a revival of the original series. Breaking Bad (#3) and The Good Wife (#33) are the only programmes to also have spin-off series place on the list, with Better Call Saul (#23) and The Good Fight (#47), respectively. Only 7 programmes do not fall under the scripted live action genre; four animated shows — BoJack Horseman (#11), Avatar: The Last Airbender (#61), Rick and Morty (#76) and Steven Universe (#99) — and three non-fiction shows — the reality competition series RuPaul's Drag Race (#67) and the non-fiction docuseries Planet Earth (#73) & O.J.: Made in America (#81). Damon Lindelof is the creator with the most shows on the list with three; The Leftovers (#7); Lost (#19) and Watchmen (#26).

Selection criteria

BBC Culture asked 206 television experts from around the world to rank the ten television programs produced in the twenty-first century that they considered the greatest. Participants were permitted to choose from titles released between January 2000 to July 2021 (when all responses were collected). Each program listed in these responses was then given points based on their ranking. If a program was ranked first in a critic's list, that program would get ten points, whereas the one ranked in tenth place would get one point. The list features three ties: Downton Abbey and Band of Brothers for the 36th-place ranking; The Good Place and Pose for the 62nd-place ranking and Narcos and Normal People for the 84th-place ranking.

A total of 206 critics from 43 countries participated in the poll, with the largest number (52) from the United Kingdom, followed by 29 from the United States. Out of the 206, 104 are men, 100 are women, and two are non-binary.

Top 100

Notes

References

BBC-related lists
Top television lists
Television criticism
2021 in television
2021 in British television
21st-century television series